The 1892 Illinois Fighting Illini football team was an American football team that represented the University of Illinois during the 1892 college football season.  In their first season under head coach Edward K. Hall, the Illini compiled a 7–4–1 record. Fullback Ralph W. Hart was the team captain.

Schedule

Source: SR/College Football

Roster

Source: University of Illinois

References

Illinois
Illinois Fighting Illini football seasons
Illinois Fighting Illini football